Syntenin-2 is a protein that in humans is encoded by the SDCBP2 gene.

References

Further reading